Machek Posht (also Romanized as Māchak Posht) is a village in Esfivard-e Shurab Rural District, in the Central District of Sari County, Mazandaran Province, Iran. At the 2006 census, its population was 3,000, in 800 families.

name of machek posht 
machek is a term with roots in Eastern Europe and The name of the river that passes through the center of the village and finally
To join Siahrud.

References 

Populated places in Sari County